Faltu ( Useless) is an Indian Hindi language drama television series produced under Boyhood Productions, starring Niharika Chouksey and Aakash Ahuja. It premiered on 2 November 2022 on StarPlus and digitally streams on Disney+ Hotstar.

Plot
The story revolves around an unwanted girl, Faltu, named useless after her parents' frustration at the birth of a third girl and a stillborn twin son.

She grew up in a feudal family of rural Rajasthan, being ill treated and disregarded by everyone except her father and cousin Pratap for her gender, birth order and passions. Rejecting the traditional role of a meek and homemaking woman, Faltu harbours a love for cricket, playing with various improvised bats like sticks and brooms, further drawing the mockery of the village while she fights against the stigma trying to make her family proud.

Things change when she crosses paths with Ayaan Mittal, who is the son of a wealthy CEO and a proficient cricketer despite swearing off the sport. He is visiting her village with his cousin Suhana for business. He notices her talent despite bad first impressions, and his offer of coaching her begins a new journey in her unacknowledged life.

Complications in their budding relationship loom as Ayaan is engaged to Tanisha in an arranged marriage among family friends back in Mumbai. Faltu must also fight against an arranged marriage with an older man and many other social ills along the way. Ayaan comes and takes Faltu with him to Mumbai and takes her to his Paternal Aunt Rijwala. Pappi(Who is Faltu's Fianće) comes behind Faltu till Mumbai. Soon Ayaan's Family invites Rijwala and her husband to Ayaan's Wedding and Faltu also comes with them. Ayaan helps Faltu achieve her Dreams in Mumbai and sends her to Mumbai Women's National Cricket Academy. But unfortunately one day when Faltu visits the doctor is informed that she has an illness which can cause her to become blind and she has only three months to see. She doesn't want Ayaan to know the truth and increase his troubles. Suddenly one day everybody learns the truth that Ayaan eloped Faltu from her wedding and that he had gone mia from his own pre-wedding rituals multiple times trying to help Faltu. They disapprove of Faltu staying with them. Faltu leaves the house and starts living on the streets & faces many harsh circumstances. On Ayaan's wedding day with Tanisha, Pappi discovers Faltu's whereabouts and kidnaps her. Pappi tries to forcefully marry Faltu but Ayaan learns that Faltu has been kidnapped and comes to save Faltu, but only after taking permission from Tanisha this time. Ayaan gets injured, accidentally fills Faltu's Maang with Vermillion and falls unconscious. Soon Faltu also gets blind and cannot see anything. The police arrives and takes Ayaan with them but Faltu runs away and hides in a jungle. Ayaan still asks the police for Faltu but they do not tell him anything. Ayaan arrives home and starts the rituals for getting married with Tanisha. Tanisha also chooses to trust him and asks police to locate Faltu seeing Ayaan worried, making him happy. Faltu meanwhile escapes police as she wants to go away from Ayaan's life in order to not make his life difficult, but starts wearing sindoor and mangalsutra of Ayaan's name.

Cast

Main
 Niharika Chouksey as Faltu Ayaan Mittal – Charan and Jamuna's youngest daughter; Lajwanti and Antima's sister; Pratap and Som's cousin; Ayaan's first wife (2022-present)
 Aakash Ahuja as Ayaan Mittal – Savita's son; Janardhan's adoptive son; Kinshuk's adoptive brother; Siddharth and Suhana's adoptive cousin; Faltu and Tanisha's husband (2022-present)

Recurring
 Drishti Thakur as Tanisha Ayaan Mittal – Kanika's daughter; Ayaan's second wife; Siddharth's friend (2022-present)
 Thakur Rajveer Singh as Pappi Ji – Faltu's ex-fiancé who is twice Faltu's age (2022-2023)
 Farida Venkat as Mayawati Thakur – Janardhan, Govardhan and Harshvardhan's mother; Kinshuk, Siddharth and Suhana's grandmother; Ayaan's adoptive grandmother (2022-present)
 Mahesh Thakur as Janardhan Mittal – Mayawati's eldest son; Savita's husband; Kinshuk's father; Ayaan's adoptive father (2022-present)
 Vibhavari Pradhan as Savita Mittal – Janardhan's wife; Ayaan and Kinshuk's mother (2022-present)
 Azhar J Malik as Kinshuk Mittal – Janardhan and Savita's son; Ayaan's half-brother; Siddharth and Suhana's cousin; Ayesha's husband (2022-present)
 Esha Pathak as Ayesha Mittal – Kinshuk's wife (2022-present)
 Jiten Mukhi as Govardhan Mittal – Mayawati's second son; Janardhan and Harshvardhan's brother; Sumitra's husband; Siddharth's father (2022-present)
 Rakhee Tandon as Sumitra Mittal – Govardhan's wife; Siddharth's mother (2022-present)
 Rajat Verma as Siddharth Mittal – Govardhan and Sumitra's son; Kinshuk and Suhana's cousin; Ayaan's adoptive cousin (2022-present)
 Rajeev Bhardwaj as Harshvardhan Mittal – Mayawati's youngest son; Janardhan and Govardhan's brother; Kumkum's husband; Suhana's father (2022-present)
 Akshaya Bhingarde as Kumkum Mittal; Harshvardhan's wife; Suhana's mother (2022-present)
 Myra Singh as Suhana Mittal – Govardhan and Kumkum's daughter; Kinshuk and Siddharth's cousin; Ayaan's adoptive cousin (2022-present)
 Monica Sharma as Jamuna Singh – Charan's wife; Lajwanti, Antima and Faltu's mother (2022-present)
 Jaideep Singh as Charan Singh – Jamuna's husband; Lajwanti, Antima and Faltu's father (2022-present)
 Kajal Rathore as Lajwanti Singh – Jamuna and Charan's eldest daughter; Antima and Faltu's sister; Pratap and Som's cousin (2022-present)
 Peehu Biswas as Antima Singh – Jamuna and Charan's second daughter; Lajwanti and Faltu's sister; Pratap and Som's cousin (2022-present)
 Priyanka Rathod as Angoori Singh – Ratan's wife; Pratap and Som's mother (2022-present)
 Faiz Mohammad Khan as Ratan Singh – Charan's brother; Angoori's husband; Pratap and Som's father (2022-present)
 Aaryan Shah as Pratap Singh; Angoori and Ratan’s son; Som's brother; Lajwanti, Antima and Faltu's cousin (2022-present)
 Darsh Kothari as Som Singh; Angoori and Ratan’s son; Pratap’s brother; Lajwanti, Antima and Faltu's cousin (2022-present)
 Vibhuti Thakur as Rijula Mittal (2022-present)
 Jay Zaveri as Alok Agarwal; Rijula's husband (2022-present)
 Sonia Singh as Kanika - Tanisha's mother; Janardhan's best friend (2022–present)

Production

Casting
Niharika Chouksey was cast as the female lead, and later Aakash Ahuja was confirmed as the male lead.

Development
The series was announced by Boyhood Productions and confirmed in September 2022 by StarPlus. The shooting of the series began in September 2022 in Jaipur, India.

Release
The first promo was released on 30 September 2022, featuring the leads Niharika Chouksey and Aakash Ahuja. StarPlus released and promoted the show as a "unique story of an unwanted girl child."

See also 
 List of programmes broadcast by StarPlus

References

External links
 Faltu on Disney+ Hotstar

2022 Indian television series debuts
2020s Indian television series
Indian television sitcoms
Hindi-language television shows
Indian television soap operas
Television shows set in Jaipur
StarPlus original programming